Like all municipalities of Puerto Rico, Ciales is subdivided into administrative units called barrios,  which are roughly comparable to minor civil divisions. The barrios and subbarrios, in turn, are further subdivided into smaller local populated place areas/units called sectores (sectors in English). The types of sectores may vary, from normally sector to urbanización to reparto to barriada to residencial, among others.

List of sectors by barrio

Ciales barrio-pueblo
 Barriada La Aldea
 Barriada La Cuerda
 Barriada Otero
 Barriada Santo Domingo
 Barriada Verdum
 Calle Morovis
 Calle Nueva
 Comunidad Cuba
 Comunidad Los Milagros
 Residencial Colinas de Jaguas
 Residencial Fernando Sierra Berdecía
 Sector Las Guabas

Cialitos
 Atrecho
 Hacienda Flor de Alba
 La Quinta
 Los Figueroa
 Los López
 Mameyes
 Parcelas Cialitos
 Parcelas Toño Colon
 Portón
 Sector Los Naturópatas

Cordillera
 Barriada Los Rosario
 Camino Los Pagán
 Carretera 146
 Comunidad Ortega
 Comunidad Villalobos
 Parcelas Alturas de Cordillera (Parcelas Nuevas)
 Parcelas Cordillera
 Sector El Cinco
 Sector El Seis
 Sector El Siete
 Sector El Tres
 Sector Las Lomas
 Sector Sonador

Frontón
 Comunidad Ana Rosario
 Comunidad El Perico
 Comunidad Juan Pino
 Comunidad Los Burgos
 Comunidad Los González
 Comunidad Quique Pagan
 Comunidad San Virón
 Parcelas Seguí Nueva
 Parcelas Seguí Vieja
 Comunidad Sumidero
 Sector Atrecho
 Sector Garau
 Sector La Aldea
 Sector Limón
 Sector Raynes
 Sector Sabana
 Sector Yunes

Hato Viejo
 Sector Caliche
 Sector Campamento
 Sector Cuchillas
 Sector Cumbre
 Sector El Cuco
 Sector La Grama
 Sector Las Lajas
 Sector Las Lomas
 Sector Los Arnao
 Sector Los Barberos
 Sector Los Rosa
 Sector Los Otero
 Urbanización Alturas de Ciales
 Urbanización Monterrey

Jaguas
 Brisas de Ciales
 Comunidad Los Santiago
 Extensión San José
 Quintas de Ciales
 Reparto Alvelo
 Reparto Cabiya
 Reparto Del Carmen
 Reparto San Miguel
 Sector Club de Leones
 Sector Cojo Vales
 Sector La Línea
 Sector La Loma
 Sector La Pitahaya
 Sector La Roca
 Sector Las Casitas
 Sector Los Mucho
 Sector Los Robles
 Sector Naranjo Dulce
 Sector Santa Clara
 Sector Vaga
 Sector Ventana

Pesas
 Parcelas María
 Sector Capilla
 Sector Cerro Gordo
 Sector La Cuarta
 Sector Las Cañas
 Sector Los Arocho
 Sector Los Cruz
 Sector Peñonales
 Sector Puente
 Sector Tortuguero
 Urbanización Los Llanos

Pozas
 Sector Cascana
 Sector Capilla
 Sector Cuesta Mata
 Sector El Cedro
 Sector El Gundo
 Sector El Hoyo
 Sector Frontera
 Sector Las Lomas
 Sector Llanadas
 Sector Manicaboa
 Sector Villanueva

Toro Negro
 Casa Blanca
 Dos Bocas
 La Piedra
 Vega Redonda

See also

 List of communities in Puerto Rico

References

Ciales
Ciales